The  is a professional golf tournament on the Japan Golf Tour. It has been played annually since 1993. It is usually the first event played on the Japan Golf Tour season. The tournament record is 267 (−21). It was set by Wayne Perske in 2006. The course measures 7,081 yards and the par is 71. Since 2009, the purse has been ¥130,000,000 with ¥26,000,000 going to the winner. Prize money was ¥90,000,000 from 1993 to 1997, ¥110,000,000 in 1998, ¥100,000,000 from 1999 to 2005 and ¥110,000,000 from 2006 to 2008.

Tournament hosts

Winners

Notes

References

External links
 
Coverage on the Japan Golf Tour's official site

Japan Golf Tour events
Golf tournaments in Japan
Sport in Mie Prefecture
Recurring sporting events established in 1993
1993 establishments in Japan